Baty's Marsh is a   Local Nature Reserve in Rochester in Kent. It is owned and managed by  Medway Council.

This is one of the few remaining salt marshes in the Medway area, and it has a rich fauna, especially wading birds.

There is access from Manor Lane.

References

Local Nature Reserves in Kent